William Upjohn may refer to:

William E. Upjohn (1853–1932), American doctor
William George Dismore Upjohn (1888–1979), Australian surgeon